Nellie Cournoyea  (born March 4, 1940 in Aklavik, Northwest Territories) is a Canadian politician, who served as the sixth premier of the Northwest Territories from 1991 to 1995. She was the first female premier of a Canadian territory and the second female premier in Canadian history after Rita Johnston of British Columbia.

Cournoyea is of mixed Norwegian and Inupiaq heritage.

Before entering politics, Cournoyea was an announcer and station manager for CBC North in Inuvik, and a land claims worker for the Inuit Tapirisat of Canada.

She was first elected to the territorial Legislative Assembly in 1979, representing the electoral district of Western Arctic until it was dissolved in 1983, and then the new district of Nunakput for the remainder of her career in politics. She served the government in a variety of cabinet positions.

On November 14, 1991, she was chosen as premier under the territory's consensus government system, in which the premier is chosen by elected members following the general election. Cournoyea served as premier until 1995, and subsequently chose not to stand for reelection to the Legislative Assembly. She currently serves as chair and CEO of the Inuvialuit Regional Corporation.

She was a winner of a National Aboriginal Achievement Award, now the Indspire Awards, in 1994, and has been awarded honorary doctorates in law from Lakehead University, Carleton University and the University of Toronto.

In 2008, she was made an Officer of the Order of Canada as well as inducted into the Aboriginal Business Hall of Fame. In 2016, Cournoyea received the Order of the Northwest Territories.

As a child, Cournoyea attended an aboriginal residential school. The Truth and Reconciliation Commission's report described how she was sheltered by Aboriginal families along her route when she ran away from an Anglican hostel in the Northwest Territories after a confrontation with a teacher.

See also
Notable Aboriginal people of Canada

References

External links
Life and times of Nellie Cournoyea CBC.
The Inuvialuit Land Claim NWT Historical Timeline

1940 births
Canadian people of Norwegian descent
Premiers of the Northwest Territories
Living people
Members of the Legislative Assembly of the Northwest Territories
Officers of the Order of Canada
Members of the Order of the Northwest Territories
Inuit politicians
Canadian female first ministers
Women MLAs in the Northwest Territories 
Inuvialuit people
People from Aklavik
Indspire Awards
Canadian Inuit women
Inuit from the Northwest Territories